Yamada is a Japanese surname.

Yamada may also refer to:

Places
Yamada, Chiba-machi, a former town in Chiba Prefecture
Yamada, Fukuoka-shi, a former city in Fukuoka Prefecture
Yamada District, Gunma, a former district in Gunma Prefecture
Yamada, Iwate-machi, town in Iwate Prefecture
Yamada, Miyazaki-cho, a former town in Miyazaki Prefecture
Yamada, Toyama-mura, a former village in Toyama Prefecture

Other uses
Yamada, a brand used by Umax
Yamada Corporation, a Japanese defense trading company
Yamada Station (disambiguation), multiple railway stations in Japan
Yamada-dera, a former Buddhist temple in Sakurai, Nara Prefecture, Japan
Yamada Denki